Trendelenburg's sign  is found in people with weak or paralyzed abductor muscles of the hip, namely gluteus medius and gluteus minimus.  It is named after the German surgeon Friedrich Trendelenburg. It is often incorrectly referenced as the Trendelenburg test which is a test for vascular insufficiency in the lower extremities.

The Trendelenburg sign is said to be positive if, when standing on one leg (the 'stance leg'), the pelvis severely drops on the side opposite to the stance leg (the 'swing limb'). The muscle weakness is present on the side of the stance leg. If the patient compensates for this weakness (by tilting their trunk/thorax to the affected side), then the pelvis will be raised, rather than dropped, on the side opposite to the stance leg. Ergo, in the same situation, the patient's hip may be dropped or raised, dependent upon whether the patient is actively compensating, as above, or not. Compensation shifts the centre of gravity to the affected side, and also decreases the angle between the hip adductor muscles and femur, both of which decrease the forces needing to be applied by the hip adductor muscles to maintain relevant posture.

The gluteus medius is very important during the stance phase of the gait cycle to maintain both hips at the same level. Moreover, one leg stance accounts for about 60% of the gait cycle. Furthermore, during the stance phase of the gait cycle, there is approximately three times the body weight transmitted to the hip joint.  The hip abductors' action accounts for two thirds of that body weight. A Trendelenburg sign can occur when there is presence of a muscular dysfunction (weakness of the gluteus medius or minimus) or when someone is experiencing pain.

See also
 Gait abnormality
 Superior gluteal nerve
 Trendelenburg gait

References

External links
 Trendelenburg Test at GPNotebook

Athletic training
Symptoms and signs: musculoskeletal system